Catarroja is a municipality in the comarca of Horta Sud in the Valencian Community, Spain.

Toponym 

The town name is originally a hybrid between the Arabic term إقطاع ("iqṭā"), which means "land", and the Valencian term "roja", which means red.

Local politics
The Spanish Socialist Workers' Party held the mayoralty from 1979 until 1995 when a People's Party-led administration replaced them. This served until 2015 when Coalició Compromís gained the mayoral position as part of a minority administration.

Summary of council seats won

Source:

*Results for the Communist Party of Spain. In 1986 they joined with other parties to form the current United Left.

#In 1983, the People's Alliance (AP), Democratic Popular Party (PDP), Liberal Union (UL) and Valencian Union (UV) formed a four-party electoral alliance. The electoral alliance ended in 1986 and the AP and UV contested the 1987 local elections separately. In 1989 the AP merged with the PDP and UL to form the current People's Party.

†Results for the Valencian People's Union, who later formed the Valencian Nationalist Bloc (BNV).

List of mayors

References

Municipalities in the Province of Valencia
Horta Sud